Yanina Wickmayer was the defending champion, but she chose to play in Rome rather than defend 2009 title here.

Anastasija Sevastova won her first WTA singles title, defeating Arantxa Parra Santonja in the final 6–2, 7–5.

Seeds

Draw

Finals

Top half

Bottom half

References
Main Draw
Qualifying Draw

Estoril Open - Singles
Portugal Open
Estoril Open - Women's Singles, 2010